Katesgrove is an inner-town district immediately to the south of the centre of the town of Reading, in the English county of Berkshire. It is bounded on the north by the Inner Distribution Road, on the east by Sidmouth Street, Kendrick Road and Northumberland Avenue, on the south by Long Barn Lane and Rose Kiln Lane and on the west by the River Kennet.

Electoral ward
The district of Katesgrove corresponds closely to the Katesgrove electoral ward of the Borough of Reading. In addition to the traditional definition of Katesgrove (as given above), this includes a strip of land between the A33 and the River Kennet, including the flats on the site of the Reading Central goods depot and the commercial buildings to the south, that would more normally be regarded as part of the district of Coley. The ward is bordered by Abbey, Redlands, Church, Whitley and Coley wards and forms part of the Reading East parliamentary constituency.

Katesgrove elects three councillors to the unitary Reading Borough Council, with each elected in separate years for a four-year term. Traditionally an area of strength for the Labour Party, one of Katesgrove's councillors was Labour's David Sutton, who was leader of the council for thirteen years before his defeat by a Liberal Democrat, Warren Swaine, in 2008. The 2000s witnessed a surge in votes for the Liberal Democrats, resulting in 2007 with the election of Gareth Epps, the constituency's 2010 candidate who achieved second place in that election - culminating in 2010 with all Katesgrove councillors being Liberal Democrats. However, the 2011 council election saw Labour candidate Matt Rodda, who is now MP for Reading East, elected, and over the following years Labour regained the remaining seats.

In the 2022 election, at which all councillors faced re-election because of boundary changes, a swing from the Labour Party to the Green Party led to the latter gaining two of the three seats. As a result, the councillors are Liam Challenger of the Labour Party, and Doug Cresswell and Louise Keane, both of the Green Party.

Notable people
 Fred Potts VC, holder of the Victoria Cross.

See also
East Reading

References

External links
 
 Katesgrove Community Association

Suburbs of Reading, Berkshire
Wards of Reading